Rugby league is a new sport in Chile. It has grown rapidly from nothing to 8 teams in less than one year.

History

Rugby league was first played by Chilean Australians as part of the Latin Heat Rugby League.

References

Chile
Sport in Chile
Rugby league in South America